Adam Madison Beeler (October 11, 1879 – March 25, 1947) was a justice of the Washington Supreme Court from 1930 until 1932. Beeler served as a King County Superior Court Judge between April 6, 1928 and September 30, 1930, when he was appointed to the Supreme Court by Governor Roland H. Hartley.

Born in Bluffton, Wells County, Indiana, to Peter and Elizabeth Beeler, he attended the Indiana University, where he met his future wife, Florence Leona Scott (November 30, 1887 – January 12, 1960), and was graduated in 1903. He then attended George Washington University Law School. He was married to Florence Scott on April 8, 1909, in Seattle, and they had a son and two daughters: Madison Scott Beeler, Elizabeth Beller, and Virginia Jean Beeler.

Beeler had served in the Washington House of Representatives from 1922 until 1928. In 1932, Beeler resigned his court seat to run for United States Senate, and after losing the primary he was considered in November 1932 as a replacement to Wesley Livsey Jones, following his death.

References

1869 births
1947 deaths
People from Wells County, Indiana
Indiana University Bloomington alumni
George Washington University Law School alumni
Lawyers from Seattle
Republican Party members of the Washington House of Representatives
20th-century American judges
Justices of the Washington Supreme Court
Superior court judges in the United States